Tomáš Galo (born 6 December 1996) is a Slovak football midfielder who currently plays for Fortuna Liga club ŽP Šport Podbrezová.

Club career

FO ŽP Šport Podbrezová
He made his professional Fortuna Liga debut for ŽP Šport Podbrezová against Spartak Myjava on 19 July 2014.

References

External links
 
 ŽP Šport Podbrezová profile
 Eurofotbal profile

1996 births
Living people
Slovak footballers
Association football midfielders
FK Železiarne Podbrezová players
Slovak Super Liga players